Anadiplosis (anadíplōsis, "a doubling, folding up") is the repetition of the last word of a preceding clause. The word is used at the end of a sentence and then used again at the beginning of the next sentence.

Examples
Catch for us foxes,/ foxes, little ones, which ruin vineyards,/ and our vineyards [are] in bloom. —Song of Songs 2:15 (in Hebrew "and our vineyards" in the third line is one word)
Noust in the grass / grass in the wind /  wind on the lark /  lark for the sun / Sun through the sea / sea in the heart / heart in its noust / nothing is lost —John Glenday, Noust
 "Fear leads to anger. Anger leads to hate. Hate leads to suffering." —Yoda
 "For Lycidas is dead, dead ere his prime, Young Lycidas and hath not left his peer." —John Milton, Lycidas
"Queeg: 'Aboard my ship, excellent performance is standard. Standard performance is sub-standard. Sub-standard performance is not permitted to exist. —Herman Wouk, The Caine Mutiny.
"Mine be thy love, and thy love's use their treasure." —Shakespeare, Sonnet 20.
"Having power makes [totalitarian leadership] isolated; isolation breeds insecurity; insecurity breeds suspicion and fear; suspicion and fear breed violence." —Zbigniew Brzezinski, The Permanent Purge: Politics in Soviet Totalitarianism
 "What I present here is what I remember of the letter, and what I remember of the letter I remember verbatim (including that awful French)." —Vladimir Nabokov, Lolita
 "The years to come seemed waste of breath, / A waste of breath the years behind" — William Butler Yeats "An Irish Airman Foresees His Death"
 “Your beliefs become your thoughts, your thoughts become your words, your words become your actions, your actions become your habits, your habits become your values, your values become your destiny.” 
Turn the lights out now, Now I'll take you by the hand, Hand you another drink, Drink it if you can, Can you spend a little time, Time is slipping away, Away from us so stay, Stay with me I can make, Make you glad you came — Nathan Sykes of The Wanted, 2010
 "To lead a better life, I need my love to be here / Here, making each day of the year", etc. — Paul McCartney, "Here, There and Everywhere"
 "I love her!  Isn't that a wonder? / I wonder why I didn't want her? / I want her!  that's the thing that matters! / And matters are improving daily!" — Sheldon Harnick, "She Loves Me"

See also
Antimetabole
Epanalepsis
Figure of speech
Andhadhi, a form of Tamil poetry that relies upon anadiplosis

References

Corbett, Edward P.J. Classical Rhetoric for the Modern Student. Oxford University Press, New York, 1971.

External links
 Audio illustrations of anadiplosis

Rhetorical techniques
Figures of speech